Andrei Finonchenko (Russian: Андрей Финонченко; born 21 June 1982) is a Kazakh football coach and former footballer striker who spent his whole career with FC Shakhter Karagandy, as well as representing the Kazakhstan national football team. He is currently the Sporting Director of Shakhter Karagandy.

Career

Club
Born in Karagandy, Finonchenko began his career as a left-back before being converted into a forward.

Finonchenko announced his retirement from football, and his appointment as Shakhter Karagandy new assistant manager on 3 February 2017.

International
Finonchenko made his international debut on 6 June 2003, against Poland, going on to make 20 appearances for his country, scoring five goals in the process, the first of which came against Cyprus on 19 February 2004.

Managerial
After Uladzimir Zhuravel's contract terminated by mutual consent on 3 July 2018, with Finonchenko was appointed as Caretaker Manager of Shakhter Karagandy.

On 29 November 2019, Finonchenko was appointed as Sporting Director of Shakhter Karagandy.

Career statistics

Club

International

Statistics accurate as of match played 7 June 2014

International goals

Honours
Shakhter Karagandy
Kazakhstan Premier League (2): 2011, 2012
Kazakhstan Cup (1): 2013
Kazakhstan Super Cup (1): 2013

References

External links

Profile at clubs website

1982 births
Living people
Kazakhstani footballers
Association football forwards
Kazakhstan international footballers
Kazakhstan Premier League players
FC Shakhter Karagandy players
Sportspeople from Karaganda
Kazakhstani people of Russian descent
Kazakhstani people of Ukrainian descent